Henry Charles Malden (24 February 1829 – 13 June 1907) was a nineteenth-century schoolmaster and antiquarian, notable for his role in the history of football.

Early life

Malden was born in 1829 at Ryde, Isle of Wight, the son of Charles Robert Malden and his wife Frances 
(née Cole). From 1837 to 1843 he attended Windlesham House School, which had been founded by his father. At the age of 15 he studied with the Rev. Thomas Scott in preparation for university.

Cambridge

From 1847 until 1851, Malden attended Trinity College, Cambridge. In 1848, Malden participated in the creation of a set of rules of football known as the "Cambridge Rules".  As Malden recalled in 1897:

According to his daughter Rose, Malden "always considered himself the father" of the laws of Association Football because of his role in the creation of the 1848 Cambridge Rules.  Philip Goodhart and Christopher Chataway write that Malden "can certainly claim as great a share of the history of football as Webb Ellis".

In 1851, Malden graduated from Cambridge with a football "blue".

Career

After Cambridge, Malden immediately returned to Windlesham House School, where he served as senior tutor under his father.  He succeeded his father as headmaster upon the latter's death in 1855, continuing in this position until 1888.

Family
In August 1855, Malden married Euphemia "Effie" Margaret Scott.  Effie was the daughter of the Rev. Thomas Scott, with whom Malden had studied before attending university.  She died in 1862, after the birth of their fourth child.  The widowed Malden married Catharine Walters in April 1865.

Malden's four children with Effie were Emily Scott (born Brighton 1856, died Chelsea 1933, 1 son); Charles Scott (born Brighton 1858, died Brighton 1896, five children); Rose Scott (born Brighton 1860, died Hove 1947), and Henry Melville Scott (born 1862, died 1913, 5 children). His three children with Catharine were Winifrede Walters Scott (born Brighton 1866, died 1929); Mary Effie Walters Scott (born 1871, died 1956); and John Walters Scott (born Brighton 1883).

Later life

In 1888, Malden suffered an attack of typhoid.  He retired as headmaster of Windlesham House School, succeeded by his eldest son Charles.  He moved to Crowborough, where he lived for nine years before moving again to Godalming in 1897.  It was from Godalming that he wrote his 1897 letter to the Football Association describing his memories of the creation of the Cambridge rules of football, as noted above. He edited the parish registers of Godalming for publication in 1904.

He sat on Brighton Town Council from 1886 to 1892, and on Godalming Town Council from 1891 until his death.

He died in Godalming on 13 June 1907.  He was survived by his wife Catharine and six children.

Publications

Notes

References
 

1829 births
1907 deaths
Football people in England
Alumni of Trinity College, Cambridge
People educated at Windlesham House School